Juan Manuel Coello Torres (born 21 May 1976) is a retired Honduran association footballer.

He currently is coach of the  F.C. Motagua reserves team.

Club career
Coello played as a midfielder for F.C. Motagua, with whom he won several league titles, Vida and Deportes Savio.

International career
Coello was part of the Honduras national U-20 football team that participated in the 1995 FIFA World Youth Championship in Qatar. He made his senior debut in a November 1998 friendly match against Guatemala and has earned a total of 3 caps, scoring no goals. He has represented his country at the 1999 UNCAF Nations Cup.

His final international was a March 1999 UNCAF Nations Cup against Costa Rica.

References

External links

1976 births
Living people
Sportspeople from Tegucigalpa
Association football midfielders
Honduran footballers
Honduras international footballers
F.C. Motagua players
C.D.S. Vida players
Deportes Savio players
Liga Nacional de Fútbol Profesional de Honduras players